Smoković is a village in Croatia, in the municipality of Zemunik Donji, Zadar County.

Demographics
According to the 2011 census, the village of Smoković has 110 inhabitants. This represents 10.69% of its pre-war population according to the 1991 census.

The 1991 census recorded that 96.12% of the village population were ethnic Serbs (989/1029), 1.26% were Yugoslavs (13/1029), 1.26% were ethnic Croats (13/1029),  and 1.36% were of other ethnic origin (14/1029).

Gallery

See also
 Operation Maslenica
 Islam Grčki
 Donji Kašić

References

Populated places in Zadar County
Serb communities in Croatia